Since You Went Away is a 1944 American epic drama film directed by John Cromwell for Selznick International Pictures and distributed by United Artists. It is an epic about the American home front during World War II that was adapted and produced by David O. Selznick from the 1943 novel Since You Went Away: Letters to a Soldier from His Wife by Margaret Buell Wilder. The music score was by Max Steiner, and the cinematography by Stanley Cortez, Lee Garmes, George Barnes (uncredited), and Robert Bruce (uncredited).

The film is set in a mid-sized American town, where people with loved ones in the armed forces try to cope with their changed circumstances and make their own contributions to the war effort. The town is near a military base, and some of the characters are troops serving Stateside.

Though sentimental in places, Since You Went Away is somber at times about the effects of war on ordinary people. Some characters on the home front are dealing with grief, loneliness, or fear for the future. Wounded and disabled troops are shown in the hospital scenes.

Plot
In January 1943, Anne Hilton is an upper-middle-class housewife living in a Midwestern town near a military base with her two teenage daughters, Jane and Bridget ("Brig"). Anne's beloved husband Tim Hilton has volunteered for U.S. Army service in World War II. Anne has just returned from seeing her husband off to Camp Claiborne, and she and her daughters must adjust to Tim's absence and make other sacrifices for the war effort, including food rationing; planting a victory garden; giving up the services of their loyal maid Fidelia who nevertheless offers to continue working part-time for the Hiltons while foregoing wages; and taking in a boarder, the curmudgeonly retired Colonel Smollett. When the Hiltons travel by train in a failed attempt to see Tim one last time before he ships out, they encounter or travel with many other people whose lives have been affected by the war, and they end up not getting to see Tim because their train is delayed to allow a defense supply train to go through first. In contrast, the Hiltons' socialite neighbor Emily Hawkins complains about the inconveniences caused by the war and engages in unsupportive behaviors such as hoarding food and criticizing the Hiltons' efforts.

The Colonel has a strained relationship with his young grandson, Bill Smollett, because Bill dropped out of West Point and is now serving in the U.S. Army as a mere corporal rather than an officer. An old friend of Anne and Tim's, U.S. Navy Lieutenant Tony Willett, also visits the Hiltons while awaiting his orders. Bill quickly falls for Jane, who has a crush on Tony, who in turn has long been attracted to Anne. However, after Tony leaves, Bill and Jane's relationship slowly develops and they fall in love. They become engaged, but Bill convinces Jane to wait until after the war to get married. Bill finally is sent overseas and Jane tearfully runs after his departing train to tell him goodbye. The Colonel, who under his gruff exterior really does care about his grandson, conveys his good wishes to Bill via Anne, but arrives too late to say goodbye in person.

Jane is determined to do more for the war effort and begins volunteering as a nurses' aide at the nearby military hospital, where returning veterans with physical and mental injuries are sent to recover. The family learns via telegram that Tim Hilton is missing in action in the Southwest Pacific. Shortly after Bill's departure, the Hiltons receive word that he was killed in action at Salerno. The Hiltons and the Colonel grieve together for Bill. Jane and Anne finally tell off Emily Hawkins after Emily suggests that it is unseemly for Jane to volunteer at the hospital, and Anne decides she herself must do more to help and trains as a welder for defense work at the shipyard.

Tony returns on leave and talks to Anne about his feelings for her, but she believes that he only keeps her as a romantic ideal because she is married to his friend Tim and therefore unattainable. Anne and Tony decide to leave things as they are and remain friends. On Christmas Eve, Fidelia places gifts under the tree that Tim had given her months earlier to leave for his family, and Anne is moved to tears. Anne then gets a cablegram by telephone informing her that Tim is safe and is coming home, and she and her daughters joyfully embrace.

Cast

 Claudette Colbert as Mrs. Anne Hilton 
 Jennifer Jones as Jane Deborah Hilton 
 Joseph Cotten as Lieutenant Commander Tony Willett 
 Shirley Temple as Bridget 'Brig' Hilton 
 Monty Woolley as Colonel William G. Smollett 
 Lionel Barrymore as Clergyman 
 Robert Walker as Corporal William G. 'Bill' Smollett II 
 Hattie McDaniel as Fidelia 
 Agnes Moorehead as Mrs. Emily Hawkins 
 Alla Nazimova as Zofia Koslowska (as Nazimova) 
 Albert Bassermann as Dr. Sigmund Gottlieb Golden 
 Gordon Oliver as Marine Officer seeking room 
 Keenan Wynn as Lieutenant Solomon 
 Guy Madison as Sailor Harold E. Smith 
 Craig Stevens as Danny Williams
 Lloyd Corrigan as Mr. Mahoney, the Grocer
 Jackie Moran as Johnny Mahoney
 Wallis Clark as Man at Cocktail Lounge (uncredited)
 George Chandler as Taxi Driver (uncredited)
 Dorothy Dandridge as Black Officer's Wife in railway station (uncredited)
 Warren Hymer as Convalescing Soldier asking for Tutti Frutti ice-cream
 Rhonda Fleming as Susie Fleming, girl at dance (uncredited)
 Byron Foulger as High School Principal (uncredited)
 Andrew V. McLaglen as Former plowboy (uncredited)
 Edwin Maxwell as Businessman in Cocktail Lounge (uncredited)
 Terry Moore as Refugee Child on train (uncredited)
 Adeline De Walt Reynolds as a Grandmother on train (uncredited)
 Ruth Roman as Envious Girl in Train Station (uncredited)
 Butterfly McQueen as WAC Sergeant (deleted scene, uncredited)

Reception
According to The New York Times critic Bosley Crowther, Since You Went Away features a script with an "excess of exhausting emotional detail"; Crowther was impressed with the performances, but had issues with the film as a whole:

As the mother and center of the family, Claudette Colbert gives an excellent show of gallantly self-contained emotion, and Jennifer Jones is surpassingly sweet as a well-bred American daughter in the first bloom of womanhood and love. Robert Walker is uncommonly appealing as the young soldier whom she tragically adores, and Shirley Temple, now grown to "teen-age freshness", is pert as the young sister. Monty Woolley makes a full-blown character of the man who comes to lodge; Joseph Cotten is droll as the Navy playboy, and Hattie McDaniel does an Andy-act quite well... No doubt, this would have been a sharper picture if Mr. Selznick had played it in much less time, and it would have been considerably more significant had he kept it somewhat closer to average means. Two hours and fifty-one minutes is a lot of time to harp upon one well-known theme -lonesomeness and anxiety. And that is all this picture really does.

The movie was successful and earned $4,950,000 in North American rentals during its theatrical release, and over $7 million in rentals overall.

Behind the scenes
The farewell scene between Jones and Walker at the railway station was parodied in the film Airplane! (1980) Jones and Walker played young sweethearts in Since You Went Away, but in real life, they were married at the time and going through a break-up. They divorced not long after the film was completed (Jones later married Selznick after his marriage to Irene Mayer Selznick ended).

Accolades

The film is recognized by American Film Institute in these lists:
 2006: AFI's 100 Years...100 Cheers – Nominated

Home media
Since You Went Away was released to DVD by MGM Home Video on October 19, 2004 in a Region 1 fullscreened DVD. It was later released on Blu-ray by Kino Classics on November 21, 2017.

References

External links
 
 
 
 
 

1944 films
American drama films
American black-and-white films
Films scored by Max Steiner
Films based on American novels
Films based on military novels
Films directed by John Cromwell
Films produced by David O. Selznick
Films set on the home front during World War II
Films that won the Best Original Score Academy Award
Selznick International Pictures films
United Artists films
World War II films made in wartime
1944 drama films
1940s English-language films